Gaas or GAAS may refer to:

People
 Abdiweli Gaas, Somali politician
 Hans Gaas
 Mohamouda Ahmed Gaas, Ethiopian politician

Places
 Gaas, Landes, Nouvelle-Aquitaine, France

Other
 Gaelic Athletic Association
 Galeria de Artes Álvaro Santos, Brazilian art gallery founded in 1966
 Gallium arsenide (GaAs), semiconductor
 Games as a service, revenue model
 Generally Accepted Auditing Standards